Dungu may refer to:

 Dungu, Democratic Republic of the Congo, a town in Haut-Uélé Province
 Dungu language, found in Kaduna State, Nigeria
 Pjetër Dungu (1908-1989), an Albanian musician
 Dungu, Ghana, a suburb in Tamale Metropolitan District in the Northern Region of Ghana
 Dungu River (Democratic Republic of the Congo)